Aalborg Storcenter is a shopping mall located in Skalborg, a City District of Aalborg, Denmark.
It opened in 1996.

The mall has about 65 stores. One of those is Denmark's largest Bilka store.

External links
Aalborg Storcenter's web page

Companies based in Aalborg
Shopping centres in Denmark
Tourist attractions in Aalborg
Buildings and structures in Aalborg Municipality